Hudon is a surname. Notable people with the surname include:

Charles Hudon (born 1994), Canadian ice hockey player
Isabelle Hudon (born 1967), Canadian businesswoman and diplomat
Jean-Guy Hudon (born 1941), Canadian politician

See also
Hudson (surname)